Gouramis, or gouramies , are a group of freshwater anabantiform fishes that comprise the family Osphronemidae. The fish are native to Asia—from the Indian Subcontinent to Southeast Asia and northeasterly towards Korea. The name "gourami", of Indonesian origin, is also used for fish of the families Helostomatidae and Anabantidae.

Many gouramis have an elongated, feeler-like ray at the front of each of their pelvic fins. All living species show parental care until fry are free swimming: some are mouthbrooders, like the Krabi mouth-brooding betta (Betta Simplex), and others, like the Siamese fighting fish (Betta splendens), build bubble nests. Currently, about 133 species are recognised, placed in four subfamilies and about 15 genera.

The name Polyacanthidae has also been used for this family. Some fish now classified as gouramis were previously placed in family Anabantidae. The subfamily Belontiinae was recently demoted from the family Belontiidae. As labyrinth fishes, gouramis have a lung-like labyrinth organ that allows them to gulp air and use atmospheric oxygen. This organ is a vital adaptation for fish that often inhabit warm, shallow, oxygen-poor water.

Subfamilies and genera
The family Osphronemidae is divided into the following subfamilies and genera:

 family Osphronemidae van der Hoeven, 1832
 Subfamily Belontiinae Liem, 1962
 Belontia Myers, 1923
 Subfamily Osphroneminae van der Hoeven, 1832
 Osphronemus Lacepède, 1801
 Subfamily Luciocephalinae Bleeker, 1852
 Luciocephalus Bleeker, 1851
 Sphaerichthys Canestrini, 1860
 Ctenops McClelland, 1845
 Parasphaerichthys Prashad & Mukerji, 1929
 Trichopodus Lacepède, 1801
 Subfamily Macropodusinae Hoedeman, 1948
 Betta Bleeker, 1850
 Parosphromenus Bleeker, 1877
 Macropodus Lacepède, 1801
 Malpulutta Deraniyagala, 1937
 Pseudosphromenus Bleeker, 1879
 Trichopsis Canestrini, 1860
 Subafmily Trichogastrinae Bleeker, 1879
 Trichogaster Bloch & Schneider, 1801

As food
Giant gouramis, Osphronemus goramy, or Kaloi in Malay language, are eaten in some parts of the world. In Maritime Southeast Asian countries, they are often deep-fried and served in sweet-sour sauce, chili sauce, and other spices. The paradise fish, Macropodus opercularis, and other members of that genus are the target of a cannery industry in China, the products of which are available in Asian supermarkets around the world. 
Gouramis are particularly found in Sundanese cuisine.

In Malaysia, Indonesia, Thailand, Philippines, Brunei, gouramis are readily fished at streams, brooks, canal, rivers and many more large water area systems.

In the aquarium

Numerous gourami species, such as the dwarf gourami, pearl gourami, are popular aquarium fish widely kept throughout the world. They are sought after due to their bright colours and relative intelligence, being able to recognise their owners and “greeting” them, having a desire to explore the plants and rocks placed across their aquarium, and displaying extensive paternal care with the males protecting the eggs until they hatch, and building a foam raft to keep them afloat. As labyrinth fish, they will often swim near the top of the tank in order to breathe air. As with other tropical freshwater fish, an aquarium heater is often used. Gouramis will eat either prepared or live foods. Some species can grow quite large and are unsuitable for the general hobbyist. Big Gouramis may become territorial with fish that are colourful and a considerable size to them, however that generally depends on the individual’s temperament as some gourami will be more tolerant of tankmates than others. Gouramis may nip at other fish, and males should never be kept together as they will become aggressive.

Compatibility 
Generally regarded as peaceful, gouramis are still capable of harassing or killing smaller or long-finned fish. Depending on the species, adult and juvenile males have been known to spar with one another. Aggression can also occur as a result of overcrowding.

Gouramis have been housed with many species, such as danios, mollies, silver dollars, Neon tetras, and plecostomus catfish. Compatibility depends on the species of gourami and the fish it is housed with. Some species (e.g., Macropodus or Belontia) are highly aggressive or predatory and may harass or kill smaller or less aggressive fish; whereas, others (Parosphromenus and Sphaerichthys, for instance) are very shy or have specific water requirements and thus will be outcompeted by typical community fish.

Gallery

See also
The name "gourami" is used of several other related fish that are now placed in different families:
 Kissing gourami (the sole species in the family Helostomatidae)
 Climbing gouramis (family Anabantidae)

References

Anabantiformes